Georges Van Parys (7 June 1902 in Paris – 28 January 1971 in Paris) was a French composer of film music and operettas.  Among his musical influences were the group Les Six, Maurice Ravel, and Claude Debussy. Later in his career he served as vice-president of the Société des auteurs, compositeurs et éditeurs de musique.
He is buried in the cemetery at Villiers-sur-Marne.

Operettas 

 1922: Madame la Comtesse
 1923: Une bonne à rien faire 
 1927: Voila le printemps
 1936: Prends la route
 1941: Petites Annonces
 1941: L'École buissonnière  
 1943: Une femme par jour 
 1946: Virginie Déjazet
 1946: Les Chasseurs d'images 
 1949: La Tour Eiffel qui tue 
 1950: Tristoeil et Brunehouille
 1951: L'Affaire Fualdès (about murder of A.B. Fualdès & subsequent trial)
 1951: La Reine-Mère 
 1953: Que d'eau, que d'eau
 1956: Minnie-Moustache
 1960: Le Jeu des dames 
 1961: La Belle de Paris

With Philippe Parès :

 1927: Quand y en a pour deux
 1927: Lulu, libretto Serge Véber, Théâtre Daunou
 1927: La Petite Dame du Train bleu 
 1928: L'Eau à la bouche 
 1929: Louis XIV
 1930: Le cœur y est 
 1931: Couss-Couss
 1937: Ma petite amie
 1945: On cherche un roi
 1957: Le Moulin Sans-Souci

Partial filmography 

 The Woman and the Puppet (1929)
 Black and White (1931)
 Sailor's Song (1932)
 A Son from America (1932)
 Mademoiselle Josette, My Woman (1933)
 Zouzou (1934)
 Gold in the Street (1934)
 Youth (1934)
 The House on the Dune (1934)
 Counsel for Romance (1936)
 Gargousse (1938)
 The Train for Venice (1938)
 Mother Love (1938)
 Extenuating Circumstances (1939)
 Miquette (1940)
 The Mondesir Heir (1940)
 First Ball (1941)
 Romance of Paris (1941)
 The Acrobat (1941)
 Prince Charming (1942)
 Frederica (1942)
 Bolero (1942)
 At Your Command, Madame (1942)
 The Benefactor (1942)
 Mademoiselle Béatrice (1943)
 Marie-Martine (1943)
 The Midnight Sun (1943)
 Behold Beatrice (1944)
 The Eleventh Hour Guest (1945)
 Not So Stupid (1946)
 Third at Heart (1947)
 Sybille's Night (1947)
 The Heart on the Sleeve (1948)
 A Certain Mister (1950)
 Tuesday's Guest (1950)
 Old Boys of Saint-Loup (1950)
 Lady Paname (1950)
 Mademoiselle Josette, My Woman (1950)
 Rome Express (1950)
 Two Pennies Worth of Violets (1951)
 This Age Without Pity (1952)
 They Were Five (1952)
 Wonderful Mentality (1953)
 Virgile (1953)
 A Caprice of Darling Caroline (1953)
 Le Secret d'Hélène Marimon (1954)
 The Beautiful Otero (1954)
 Madame du Barry (1954)
 Service Entrance (1954)
 Les Intrigantes (1954)
 Mam'zelle Nitouche (1954)
 Scènes de ménage (1954)
 Les Impures (1954)
 Les Diaboliques (1955)
 Papa, maman, ma femme et moi (1955)
 Maid in Paris (1956)
 Comme un cheveu sur la soupe (1956)
 It Happened in Aden (1956)
 Meeting in Paris (1956)
 Women's Club (1956)
 Charming Boys (1957)
 Nathalie (1957)
 La Tour, prends garde ! (1958)
 Marie of the Isles (1959)
 Nathalie, Secret Agent (1959)
 Nina (1959)
 Le Tracassin (1961)
 Captain Fracasse (1961)
 Girl on the Road (1962)
 Mandrin (1962)
 The Bamboo Stroke (1963)
 Monsieur (1964)
 Coplan Takes Risks (1964)
 The Lace Wars  (1965)
Leontine  (1968)

Further reading 
Georges van Parys, Les jours comme ils viennent, Paris, Plon, 1969

External links 
 Georges van Parys on data.bnf.fr

1902 births
1971 deaths
Musicians from Paris
French male classical composers
French operetta composers
French film score composers
French male film score composers
French opera composers
Male opera composers
20th-century classical composers
Chevaliers of the Légion d'honneur
20th-century French composers
20th-century French male musicians